Hohenbergia salzmannii is a species of flowering plant in the Bromeliaceae family. It is endemic to Brazil.

References

salzmannii
Flora of Brazil
Taxa named by John Gilbert Baker
Taxa named by Charles Jacques Édouard Morren
Taxa named by Carl Christian Mez